Kuvshinovo is a rural locality (a settlement) in Semyonkovskoye Rural Settlement, Vologodsky District, Vologda Oblast, Russia. The population was 1,140 as of 2002. There are 6 streets.

Geography 
Kuvshinovo is located 7 km northwest of Vologda (the district's administrative centre) by road. Chashnikovo is the nearest rural locality.

References 

Rural localities in Vologodsky District